The Unexpected, aka Time Square Playhouse is a 30-minute US television anthology series  produced by Ziv Television Programs, Inc. for first-run syndication. Thirty-nine episodes aired from March 5, 1952 to December 10, 1952.

Casts 
Herbert Marshall hosted the series. Guest stars included Craig Stevens, Raymond Burr, Gale Storm, Bonita Granville, Marie Windsor, Kenneth Tobey, Marshall Thompson, Hans Conried, Tom Drake, Virginia Grey, Jim Davis (actor), and Coleen Gray.

Robert E. Lee and Jerome Lawrence were writers for the series.

Episode list

References

External links
 
The Unexpected at CVTA with episode list

1950s American anthology television series
1952 American television series debuts
1952 American television series endings
First-run syndicated television programs in the United States
Black-and-white American television shows